Siméon is a 1992 French musical film directed by Euzhan Palcy.

Synopsis 
Elderly music teacher Siméon dies and to keep his memory alive his granddaughter Orélie cuts off her braid, thus condemning him to become a Soucouyant. Siméon takes the opportunity to convince his son Isidore to continue his musical work.

Cast  
 Jean-Claude Duverger : Simeon
 Jacob Desvarieux : Isidore
 Jocelyne Beroard : Roselyne
 Lucinda Messager : Orélie
 Albert Lirvat : Albert
 Jean-Michel Martial : Max
 Gerty Dambury : Lucie
 Jean-Claude Naimro : Charlie
 Pascal Légitimus : Philomene Junior
 Frédéric Caracas : Fred
 Alain Jean-Marie : Le Pianiste
 Lisette Malidor : La Dame de feu (voice)
 Jean-Philippe Marthely : Marius

Production

Awards 
The film won the Silver Crow at the 1993 Brussels International Fantastic Film Festival.

References

Bibliography

External links 

1992 films
French musical films
1992 musical films
1990s French-language films